Royalton Hicacos is a resort in Varadero, in the province of Matanzas, Cuba. Formerly operated by Sandals Resorts as Sandals Royal Hicacos, it was bought by Canadian company Sunwing and started operating under the Royalton brand in December 2014. Facilities include pools, diving; and, a spa, tennis and squash courts, sailing, windsurfing, and diving; and a basketball court.

References

External links
  Website

Hotels in Cuba
Resorts in Cuba
Hotel buildings completed in 2003
2003 establishments in Cuba
21st-century architecture in Cuba